Roman Yegorov (born 25 January 1974) is a former Russian freestyle swimmer.

Yegorov won several medals as a member of the freestyle relay team (4×100 m and 4×200 m) during the mid-1990s. He competed at the 1996 Summer Olympics for his native country, winning two silver medals in the relay events.

External links
 

1974 births
Living people
Russian male swimmers
Swimmers at the 1996 Summer Olympics
Olympic swimmers of Russia
Olympic silver medalists for Russia
Russian male freestyle swimmers
World Aquatics Championships medalists in swimming
Medalists at the FINA World Swimming Championships (25 m)
European Aquatics Championships medalists in swimming
Medalists at the 1996 Summer Olympics
Olympic silver medalists in swimming
Goodwill Games medalists in swimming
Competitors at the 1998 Goodwill Games